The Plum Bush Creek Bridge, near Last Chance, Colorado, is a concrete rigid frame bridge that is listed on the National Register of Historic Places. It brings US 36 across Plum Bush Creek and is located at milepost 138.16 of US 36. It was designed by Colorado Department of Highways and built by Peter Kiewit Sons Construction Co. in 1938. It was listed on the National Register of Historic Places (NRHP) in 2002.

The bridge is significant as a "rare surviving example" of a concrete rigid frame bridge in rural Colorado.  It is located in an area of open high plains grasslands.

See also
 
 
 West Plum Bush Creek Bridge, nearby, also NRHP-listed

References

External links
More photos of the Plum Bush Creek Bridge at Wikimedia Commons

Road bridges on the National Register of Historic Places in Colorado
Buildings and structures in Washington County, Colorado
National Register of Historic Places in Washington County, Colorado
U.S. Route 36
Bridges of the United States Numbered Highway System
Concrete bridges in the United States